Jorge Luis Caballero Torres (born 25 January 1994), known as Jorge Caballero, is a Mexican professional footballer who last played as a midfielder for Atlético Reynosa.

Honours
Mexico U17
FIFA U-17 World Cup: 2011

Mexico U20
Central American and Caribbean Games: 2014

References

External links
 
 

Living people
1994 births
Association football defenders
C.F. Monterrey players
Atlético Reynosa footballers
Loros UdeC footballers
Liga MX players
Liga Premier de México players
Tercera División de México players
Footballers from Nuevo León
Sportspeople from Monterrey
Mexican footballers